Oorah is a battle cry common in the United States Marine Corps since the mid-20th century. It is comparable to Hooah in the United States Army, the United States Air Force, and the United States Space Force, or Hooyah in the United States Navy and the United States Coast Guard.

Origins

There are several potential sources from which the word "oorah" may have originated.

 Turkish:
 The term may have been derived from the Ottoman Turkish phrase "vur ha" translated as "strike" or the Mongolian word "urakh" meaning "rip off". It was used as a battle cry of the Ottoman Empire army and adapted as a Russian battle cry "ura".
 According to Jean Paul Roux the word "Hurrah" comes from Old Turkic, in use until medieval times. In his book, History of Turks he states: "For example, while attacking to their enemies, they (Turks) used to shout "Ur Ah!" which means "Come on, hit!" (in modern Turkish "Vur Hadi!") Then this exclamation turned into "Hurrah!" in [the] West... The difference represents diachronic change in the phonology and verbal usage in Turkish. The verb for "to hit" or "to strike" was urmak, which became vurmak in Modern Turkish. Moreover, a former subjunctive imperative verbal ending of e/a is not productive in Modern Turkish. Therefore, "ura", meaning "may it hit", which would have changed phonetically to "vura" in Modern Turkish, is expressed with "vursun".
 Mongolian:
 The term may have come from warriors of Ancient Hun or of Mongolian Empire "hurray" meaning "to move attack" or "appeal for goodness", which was formed into "(h)urra" in Russian with same meaning, and from which the Mongolia "Uria" (callings or slogans) comes from. "Hurray and Uria" words are used today in Mongolia from the ancient soldiers.
 Jack Weatherford asserts that it comes from the Mongolian "hurree", used by Mongol armies and spread throughout the world during the Mongol Empire of the 13th century, but he does not appear to present any supporting evidence. Weatherford says that in Mongolian "hurree" is a sacred praise much like amen or hallelujah.
 Germanic:
 The term may have come from Middle High German of 1580–1590 "hurren" meaning "to move fast", which was formed into "hurra" and from which the English "hurry" comes. It is still used in the Netherlands and Dutch-speaking Belgium during celebrations in the form of "hoera", as well as in Sweden, Norway and Denmark as "hurra".
 The term may be a variation of 18th century sailors exclamation "huzzah", traditionally said during salutes.
 In World War II injured US Marines were treated in northern Australia. The term 'OoRah' is said to be local slang for 'farewell' or 'until then', although it is likely to be a mishearing of the more common 'ooroo'.
 The 1st Amphibious Reconnaissance Company, FMFPAC can be credited with the introduction of "Oo-rah!" into the Marine Corps in 1953, shortly after the Korean War. Recon Marines served aboard the USS Perch (ASSP-313), a WWII–era diesel submarine retrofitted to carry Navy Underwater Demolition Teams and Recon Marines. Whenever the boat was to dive, the 1MC (PA system) would announce "DIVE! DIVE!", followed by the sound of the diving klaxon: "AHUGA!" In 1953 or 1954, while on a conditioning run, former Sergeant Major of the Marine Corps John R. Massaro, while serving as company Gunnery Sergeant of 1st Amphibious Reconnaissance Battalion, simulated the "Dive" horn sound "AHUGA!" as part of the cadence. Legend has it, he took it with him when he went to serve as an instructor at the Drill Instructor school at Marine Corps Recruit Depot San Diego. He there passed it on to the drill instructor students and they, in turn, passed it on to their recruits where it eventually and naturally became a part of the Recon cadence, and thereafter infiltrated Recon Marine lexicon. Over time, "AHUGA!" morphed into the shorter, simpler "Oo Rah!" Today, the official Marine Corps Training Reference Manual on the history of Marine Recon is titled "AHUGA!"
Marines are known to exclaim "Oorah" with a exaggerated growl to sound like a vicious canine. This growl/bark is representative of the nickname "Devil-Dogs," as Marines are known. The bark is similar in sound to the short bark of their official mascot, the Bulldog.

Other uses

 "Hoorah" is also used by United States Navy Hospital Corpsmen, Masters-at-Arms, and Seabees because of their close association with the Marine Corps.
"Urrà" is traditionally the war cry of the Italian Army Bersaglieri Corps, since their return from the Crimean War. It is speculated that it comes from the Cossacks whose battle cry was Gu-Rai! which meant "Towards the bliss of heaven!"
 "Ura" or "Hura" is the battle cry of the Russian Armed Forces, as well the Soviet Armed Forces and Red Army that preceded it. Its usage dates back to the Medieval era, derived from the Mongolian phrase hurray, meaning "to move" or "to attack". Mostly used during World War II, it is still used during military parades and Victory Day celebrations by all branches of the Russian military as well as most armed forces of the Commonwealth of Independent States and in the Bulgarian Armed Forces. It was and is also used as a patriotic phrase denoting respect to the military as well as the country itself.
 "Vashaa" (ვაშა) is the Georgian language version of the Soviet-era "Ura" that is used by personnel of the Defense Forces of Georgia during official parades.
 Oorah is the name of a Jewish non-profit in the United States.
 "Rah" is a shortened form of the word, typically said in greeting or in agreement, used in a more casual tone.

See also
 Boo-yah!, a catchphrase popularized by sportscaster Stuart Scott in the 1990s
 Hooah
 Hooyah
 Hurrah
 Huzzah
 Semper fidelis

References

External links
 

Battle cries
Interjections
Military slang and jargon
United States Marine Corps lore and symbols
English words